A Search for Reason is the second studio album by American heavy metal band Kilgore. It was released on May 12, 1998, through Revolution Records. It is considered an impressive step forward for the band. The album blends styles drawing from hardcore punk, metal and post-alternative industrial and grunge.

Background
The album was the first and final album released under the name Kilgore. The previous release, Blue Collar Solitude, was released when the band was still called Kilgore Smudge. The album features some songwriting credits to guitarist Brian McKenzie, who had left the band before the release of A Search for Reason. The song "TK-421" is a reference to a Star Wars Stormtrooper.

Track listing

Personnel
Jay Berndt – lead vocals
Bill Southerland – drums
Steve Johnson – bass
Mike Pelletier – lead guitar

References

1998 albums
Kilgore (band) albums
Albums produced by Ed Stasium